The Troubled Troubadour is a posthumous expanded compact disc edition of punk rock singer-songwriter and musician GG Allin's original 1990 7" EP of the same name.

With the 1,500-copy pressing of the original Troubled Troubador EP having long sold out by the time GG Allin had died of a drug overdose in 1993, Mountain Records owner and president Stewart Brodian had been getting a large number of requests from Allin fans who had missed out on the original recording.

In October 1995, Brodian gathered together the original master tape of the 7" EP, which was still in his possession, and with the help of Allin's friend and archivist Skeeter Rider, added an outtake from the same May 1989 session that originally produced the EP, a 1985 acoustic demo of an early Allin-composed and performed country song, two spoken word tracks recorded by Allin in 1988, two cover versions recorded with The Jabbers in 1982 and with The Disappointments in July 1989, and – probably the most fascinating of the bonus tracks – three unedited phone conversations between GG Allin and Stewart Brodian, recorded on Brodian's answering machine in New Jersey and conducted from GG's end while he was serving his felonious assault sentence in Michigan.

The bonus tracks

The phone conversations
On the phone conversations, Allin's public persona of an anti-social troublemaker is practically shattered.  He laughs, makes jokes, rationally and intelligently discusses business with Brodian regarding the original EP as well as plans for Allin's first post-prison performances, and waxes rhapsodic about his love for the country music of Hank Williams Sr., Boxcar Willie, and Stonewall Jackson ("I could listen to that shit all day."), and for old blues recordings, as well as how proud Allin was of the recordings that became the original Troubled Troubador EP and how they first came about, even going so far as to predict, "It's one of those records that'll sell forever. As years go on, people want my stuff more, even the older stuff."  Allin and Brodian, when not discussing business, found that they had a lot in common as artists that started pressing and releasing their own recordings.

The cover versions
The cover versions featured on the expanded CD edition are of GG and the Jabbers performing the Ohio Express obscurity "Up Against The Wall", and of GG and the Disappointments performing a rather chaotic version of The Rolling Stones' "Dead Flowers".  The Jabbers recording was first released on the No Rules EP in 1982 by David Peel's Orange Records label, and would later turn up on a semi-bootleg 45 in 1993, while the Disappointments recording is one of the few Allin made with that backing group before his arrest by U.S. Secret Service agents and extradition to Michigan several weeks later.

The spoken word tracks
The two spoken word tracks on the album were supplied by Skeeter Rider. GG recorded them at a low tape speed, while drunk one night in Chicago 1988.  To most ears, these tracks sound rather evil, monstrous or even possessed.  Whatever Allin's motive or intention was behind the deliberate tape speed of these tracks, it is likely that the playback was done according to Allin's own specifications, an assumption backed up by the fact that Allin fully trusted and appreciated what Brodian had done with the original EP, and had discussed doing spoken word recordings and performances after Allin's release from prison. In the hours before his death, he was discussing plans for a spoken word album.

"Rowdy Beer Drinkin' Night"
"Rowdy Beer Drinkin' Night" is almost an anomaly to people who are only familiar with Allin's stage act and/or his less civilized recordings.  A normal-sounding country and western song recorded as a demo in Allin's bathroom in 1985, Allin does not employ any profanities whatsoever in the recording – an instance rather astounding when one notes that Allin had released his infamous Eat My Fuc album the year before.  Some people have speculated that Allin was considering abandoning punk rock entirely after Eat My Fuc and embracing country music in the style of Hank Williams Sr. and Jr. and David Allan Coe at the time he wrote and recorded this demo.

In his liner notes for the CD, Brodian sums up his view of GG Allin by stating, "GG had his 'on stage' personality, but he was a really smart guy, and despite his faults, I really miss him."

Track listing
All songs written by GG Allin except where noted.
"When I Die" – 3:52
"Liquor Slicked Highway" – 2:55
"Sitting in This Room" – 2:53
"Kissing The Flames" – 2:35
Recorded on four-track cassette in Boston, MA in May 1989. Tracks 1–3 previously released as The Troubled Troubador 7" EP in 1990. Track 4 is an outtake from those sessions.
"Rowdy Beer Drinkin' Night" – 3:04
1985 acoustic demo performed and recorded by GG Allin, location unknown.
"Up Against the Wall" (Ohio Express) – 2:03
1982 recording with The Jabbers, first released on the No Rules EP.
"Conversation #1" – 25:51
Recorded by Stewart Brodian in December 1990
"Conversation #2" – 11:46
Recorded by Stewart Brodian in June 1990
"Conversation #3" – 3:10
Recorded by Stewart Brodian in July 1990
"Spoken Word #1 – The Price" – 1:52
Recorded by GG in Chicago 1988
"Dead Flowers" (Mick Jagger/Keith Richards) – 4:47
Recorded in June 1989 with The Disappointments, Staches, Columbus, OH.
"Spoken Word #2 – I Will Not Act Civilized" – 0:48
Recorded by GG in Chicago 1988

References 

1996 albums
Mountain Records albums
Albums published posthumously
GG Allin albums